Leave No Trace is a 2018 American drama film directed by Debra Granik. The film is written by Granik and Anne Rosellini, based on Peter Rock's 2009 novel My Abandonment, which is based on a true story. The plot follows a military veteran father (Ben Foster) with post-traumatic stress disorder who lives in the forest with his young daughter (Thomasin McKenzie).

Leave No Trace premiered at the 2018 Sundance Film Festival, and was theatrically released by Bleecker Street in the United States on June 29, 2018.

Plot  
Will, an Iraq War veteran suffering from PTSD, lives with his 13-year-old daughter, Tom, in the old growth Forest Park near Portland, Oregon. They live in isolation, using forest survival skills and only entering the town occasionally for food and supplies. Will makes their money by selling his VA-issued benzodiazepines to other veterans.

After Tom is spotted in the woods by a jogger, they are arrested by park rangers and detained by social services. They are assessed and Tom is found to be educationally advanced for her age despite not attending school. They are found a house to live in on a Christmas tree farm in rural Oregon in exchange for Will's work on the farm. Will begrudgingly begins work packaging trees, but is bothered by the helicopters used to move them. Tom meets a local boy who is building his own tiny house, and he introduces her to the local 4H youth club. Social services continue to check on them and require constant form filling.

One morning Will suddenly decides to leave. Tom follows reluctantly. They return to their camp in the park, but find it has been destroyed. Will and Tom try to travel in a railroad boxcar but eventually catch a ride with a trucker who takes them to Washington state and drops them off, in a remote forest area. Cold and darkness force them to build a temporary forest survival shelter for the night. The next day they discover a vacant cabin and move in. Will leaves to find food but does not return. The next morning, Tom discovers him unconscious at the bottom of a ravine with a seriously injured foot. She gets help from local quadbikers, who take them to their mobile home community. Tom refuses to let Will be taken to a hospital. Dale, a local woman, calls a friend who is a former Army medic to treat Will's injury.

Will and Tom are given an empty trailer in the community while Will's injuries heal. The medic also suffers from PTSD and lends his service dog to help Will with his nightmares. A local teaches Tom about the beehives. Tom likes their new home and tries to make a rental agreement with Dale, the trailer's owner, without telling Will. Eventually Will insists they leave. Tom protests, telling him "the same thing that's wrong with you isn't wrong with me". After leaving the RV community, Tom stops and says to Will, "I know you would stay if you could". They tearfully hug and part ways. Tom returns to the trailer community, and Will returns to the woods. Later, Tom hangs a food package in the forest for Will to find.

Cast 
 Ben Foster as Will, a military veteran suffering from PTSD
 Thomasin McKenzie as Tom, Will's daughter
 Jeff Kober as Mr. Walters, a tree farm owner
 Dale Dickey as Dale, the owner of the trailer park
 Dana Millican as Jean Bauer, Tom's social worker
 Michael Prosser as James, Will's social worker
 Derek John Drescher as Larry, a man with whom Will exchanges medications for money
 Isaiah Stone as Isaiah, a person whom Tom befriends

Production

The film was directed by Debra Granik and written by Granik and Anne Rosellini, based on the 2009 novel My Abandonment by Peter Rock. The novel is based on a true story.

Filming
Principal photography took place during the spring of 2017 in Portland, Oregon. Eagle Fern Park in Clackamas County was used for the main forest scenes.

Soundtrack
Dickon Hinchliffe, formerly of Tindersticks, composed the film score, released digitally by Lakeshore Records. This is his second collaboration with Granik, after Winter's Bone.

 "Forest Park" – 1:18
 "Rough Country" – 2:02
 "The Runner" – 1:13
 "Taken" – 1:35
 "Drive to the Farm" – 2:26
 "Raid" – 1:38
 "Return to the Forest" – 2:41
 "Lost" – 2:39
 "Not That Kind of Trouble" – 1:30
 "Tiny House" – 0:57
 "Shelter" – 3:38
 "The Long Night" – 1:40
 "Finding Will" – 1:33
 "Bus Out of Town" – 2:06
 "We Share a Star" – 2:20

Off-grid musician and former Dream Syndicate and Opal member Kendra Smith contributed the original song "Moon Boat" (her first solo recording since 1996), which plays over the end credits.

Oregon Folk musicians Michael Hurley and Marisa Anderson have cameo performances in the film.

Release
The film had its world premiere at the Sundance Film Festival on January 20, 2018. Shortly after, Bleecker Street acquired U.S. distribution rights to the film. It was released on June 29, 2018.

Reception

Critical response 
The website's critical consensus reads, "Leave No Trace takes an effectively low-key approach to a potentially sensationalistic story — and further benefits from brilliant work by Ben Foster and Thomasin McKenzie." It is the most reviewed film to hold an approval rating of 100% on the site. On Metacritic, the film has a weighted average score of 88 out of 100, based on 44 critics, indicating "universal acclaim".

Manohla Dargis of The New York Times wrote: "In its best moments, Leave No Trace invites you to simply be with its characters, to see and experience the world as they do. Empathy, the movie reminds you, is something that is too little asked of you either in life or in art. Both Mr. Foster’s and Ms. Harcourt McKenzie’s sensitive, tightly checked performances are critical in this regard." Kenneth Turan of the Los Angeles Times called it "Fiercely involving in a way we're not used to, made with sensitivity and honesty by director/co-writer Debra Granik, it tells its emotional story of a father and daughter living dangerously off the grid in a way that is unnerving and uncompromising yet completely satisfying." 
The Guardian critic Peter Bradshaw praised the movie as being a deeply intelligent story of love and survival in the wild, and gave it a perfect score of 5 out of 5. Mark Kermode named Leave No Trace his favourite film of 2018.

Peter Debruge of Variety gave the film a mixed review: "There's a listless, almost meandering nature to the story. The film's conflict is clear – this is no way to raise a child, and allowed to continue in this fashion, Will risks both his life and Tom's – and yet there’s no sense of where the script is headed, and no urgency to its resolution."

Accolades

Top ten lists
Leave No Trace was listed on numerous critics' top ten lists for 2018, among them:

 1st - Mark Kermode, The Observer
 1st - Kenneth Turan, Los Angeles Times (tied with Black Panther)
 2nd - Stephen Farber, The Hollywood Reporter
 2nd - Richard Lawson, Vanity Fair
 2nd - David Morgan, CBS News
 2nd - Staff consensus, The Guardian
 3rd - Jason Bailey, Flavorwire
 4th - Richard Roeper, Chicago Sun-Times
 4th - Peter Bradshaw, The Guardian
 4th - Sara Stewart, New York Post
 5th - Sheri Linden, The Hollywood Reporter
 5th - David Sims, The Atlantic
 5th - Lawrence Toppman, The Charlotte Observer
 5th - Staff consensus, The Sydney Morning Herald
 6th - Anita Katz, San Francisco Examiner
 6th - John Frosch, The Hollywood Reporter
 6th - Randy Myers, San Jose Mercury News
 6th - Chris Wasser, Irish Independent
 8th - Nicholas Barber, BBC Culture
 8th - Peter Rainer, Christian Science Monitor
 8th - Marc Doyle, Metacritic
 8th - Caryn James, The Hollywood Reporter
 9th - John Powers, Vogue
 10th - David Edelstein, Vulture
 10th - Josh Larsen, Filmspotting
 Top 10 (listed alphabetically) - Dana Stevens, Slate

Awards and nominations

References

External links 
 
 
 

2018 films
2018 drama films
American drama films
Bron Studios films
Bleecker Street films
Films about father–daughter relationships
Films about post-traumatic stress disorder
Films based on American novels
Films directed by Debra Granik
2018 independent films
Films set in Portland, Oregon
Films set in Washington (state)
Films shot in Portland, Oregon
Topic Studios films
2010s English-language films
2010s American films